
Gmina Nowogród is an urban-rural gmina (administrative district) in Łomża County, Podlaskie Voivodeship, in north-eastern Poland.

Villages
Apart from the town of Nowogród, Gmina Nowogród contains the villages and settlements of Baliki, Chmielewo, Dzierzgi, Grądy, Grzymały, Jankowo-Młodzianowo, Jankowo-Skarbowo, Kupnina, Mątwica, Morgowniki, Ptaki, Serwatki, Sławiec, Sławiec Dworski, Sulimy and Szablak.

Neighbouring gminas
Gmina Nowogród is bordered by the gminas of Łomża, Mały Płock, Miastkowo and Zbójna.

References

Polish official population figures 2006

Nowogrod
Łomża County